The Cadiot–Chodkiewicz coupling in organic chemistry is a coupling reaction between a terminal alkyne and a haloalkyne catalyzed by a copper(I) salt such as copper(I) bromide and an amine base. The reaction product is a 1,3-diyne or di-alkyne.

The reaction mechanism involves deprotonation by base of the terminal alkyne proton followed by formation of a copper(I) acetylide. A cycle of oxidative addition and reductive elimination on the copper centre then creates a new carbon-carbon bond.

Scope
Unlike the related Glaser coupling the Cadiot–Chodkiewicz coupling proceeds selectively and will only couple the alkyne to the haloalkyne, giving a single product. By comparison the Glaser coupling would simply produce a distribution of all possible couplings.
In one study the Cadiot–Chodkiewicz coupling has been applied in the synthesis of acetylene macrocycles starting from cis-1,4-diethynyl-1,4-dimethoxycyclohexa-2,5-diene. This compound is also the starting material for the dibromide through N-bromosuccinimide (NBS) and silver nitrate:

The coupling reaction itself takes place in methanol with piperidine, the hydrochloric acid salt of hydroxylamine and copper(I) bromide.

See also
 Glaser coupling – Another alkyne coupling reaction catalysed by a copper(I) salt.
 Sonogashira coupling – Pd/Cu catalysed coupling of an alkyne with an aryl or vinyl halide
 Castro–Stephens coupling – A cross-coupling reaction between a copper(I) acetylide and an aryl halide

References

Substitution reactions
Carbon-carbon bond forming reactions
Name reactions